Dr. Laura Bottomley, from North Carolina State University in Raleigh, North Carolina, is an electrical engineer.

In 2016. Bottomley was named a Fellow of the Institute of Electrical and Electronics Engineers (IEEE) for increasing student interest in STEM education. In 2007, she was awarded the Presidential Award for Excellence in Science, Mathematics, and Engineering Mentoring. Bottomley is also a Fellow of the American Society of Engineering Education. In 2016, she appeared in a Super Bowl commercial entitled "Doing Good with STEM."

References 

Fellow Members of the IEEE
Living people
North Carolina State University faculty
American electrical engineers
American women engineers
21st-century women engineers
Year of birth missing (living people)
American women academics
21st-century American women